Marion Township is one of the fifteen townships of Hardin County, Ohio, United States. As of the 2010 census the population was 2,440, of whom 1,079 lived in the unincorporated portions of the township.

Geography
Located in the western part of the county, it borders the following townships:
Liberty Township - north
Washington Township - northeast corner
Cessna Township - east
McDonald Township - southeast
Roundhead Township - south
Wayne Township, Auglaize County - southwest corner
Auglaize Township, Allen County - west
Jackson Township, Allen County - northwest corner

Two villages are located in Marion Township: Alger in the northwest, and McGuffey in the east.

Name and history
Marion Township was organized in 1856, and named for Francis Marion, an army officer during the American Revolutionary War. It is one of twelve Marion Townships statewide.

Government
The township is governed by a three-member board of trustees, who are elected in November of odd-numbered years to a four-year term beginning on the following January 1. Two are elected in the year after the presidential election and one is elected in the year before it. There is also an elected township fiscal officer, who serves a four-year term beginning on April 1 of the year after the election, which is held in November of the year before the presidential election. Vacancies in the fiscal officership or on the board of trustees are filled by the remaining trustees.

References

External links
County website

Townships in Hardin County, Ohio
Townships in Ohio
1856 establishments in Ohio
Populated places established in 1856